The non-marine molluscs of Egypt are a part of the molluscan fauna of Egypt (wildlife of Egypt).

A number of species of non-marine molluscs are found in the wild in Egypt.

Freshwater gastropods 

Neritidae
 Theodoxus niloticus (Reeve, 1856)

Viviparidae
 Bellamya unicolor (Olivier, 1804)

Ampullariidae
 Lanistes carinatus (Olivier, 1804)
 Pila ovata (Olivier, 1804)

Valvatidae
 Valvata nilotica Jickeli, 1874

Hydrobiidae
 Hydrobia musaensis Frauenfeld, 1855
 Ecrobia ventrosa (Montagu, 1803)

Bithyniidae
 Gabbiella senaariensis (Küster, 1852)

Melanopsidae
 Melanopsis praemorsa (Linnaeus, 1758)

Potamididae
 Potamides conicus (de Blainville, 1829)

Physidae
 Haitia acuta (Draparnaud, 1805)

Thiaridae
 Cleopatra bulimoides (Olivier, 1804)
 Cleopatra ferruginea (Lea & Lea, 1850)
 Melanoides tuberculata (O. F. Müller, 1774)

Planorbidae
 Africanogyrus coretus (de Blainville, 1826)
 Biomphalaria alexandrina (Ehrenberg, 1831)
 hybrid Biomphalaria glabrata × Biomphalaria alexandrina
 Biomphalaria glabrata (Say, 1818)
 Bulinus forskalii (Ehrenberg, 1831)
 Bulinus truncatus (Audouin, 1827)
 Gyraulus costulatus (Krauss, 1848)
 Gyraulus ehrenbergi (Beck, 1837)
 Planorbella duryi (Wetherby, 1879)
 Planorbis planorbis (Linnaeus, 1758)
 Segmentorbis angustus (Jickeli, 1874)

Lymnaeidae
 Galba truncatula (O. F. Müller, 1774)
 Galba schirazensis (Küster, 1863)
 Lymnaea stagnalis (Linnaeus, 1758)
 Pseudosuccinea columella (Say, 1817)
 Radix natalensis (Krauss, 1848)

Land gastropods 
Land gastropods in Egypt include:

Succineidae
 Succinea cleopatra Pallary, 1909

Parmacellidae
 Parmacella festae Gambetta, 1925 - northern Egypt
 Parmacella olivieri Cuvier, 1804 - northern Egypt

Subulinidae
 Rumina decollata (Linnaeus, 1758) - non-indigenous
 Rumina saharica Pallary, 1901

Cochlicellidae
 Cochlicella acuta (Muller, 1774)

Ariophantidae
 Macrochlamys indica Benson, 1832

Sphincterochilidae
 Sphincterochila boissieri (Charpentier, 1847)

Pupillidae
 Pupoides coenopictus (Hutton, 1834)

Hygromiidae
 Monacha arbustorum
 Monacha cantiana (Montagu, 1803)
 Monacha obstructa (Pfeiffer, 1842)
 Xerocrassa tanousi (Westerlund)
 Xerocrassa tuberculosa (Conrad, 1852)
 Xeropicta krynickii (Krynicki, 1833)
 Xeropicta vestalis (Pfeiffer, 1841)

Helicidae
 Cornu aspersum (O. F. Müller, 1774)
 Eobania vermiculata (O. F. Müller, 1774)
 Eremina desertorum (Forskål, 1775) - image (plate 95, figure 59)
 Eremina ehrenbergi (Roth, 1839)
 Helix pronuba Westerlund, 1879
 Theba pisana'' (Muller, 1774)

Bivalvia

Hothouse aliens 
"Hothouse aliens" in Egypt include:

See also 
Lists of molluscs of surrounding countries:
 List of non-marine molluscs of Israel, Wildlife of Israel
 List of non-marine molluscs of Libya, Wildlife of Libya
 List of non-marine molluscs of Sudan, Wildlife of Sudan

References 

Invertebrates of Egypt

Molluscs
Egypt
Egypt